The Last Time is a 2006 American independent black comedy film starring Michael Keaton, Brendan Fraser, Amber Valletta and Daniel Stern. It tells the story of a salesman and a beautiful woman who fall in love with each other and develop a relationship.

Plot
 
Ted Riker is the top salesman in the New York office of business machine company Bineview. The corporate stock lives by quarterly sales numbers, the competition is very intense, and the economy may be headed into a downturn. Ted's company is marking time until a revolutionary new product is ready, probably within a few months. Some competitors may know something about this secret innovation, through industrial espionage, and fear its impact on the market.

A new company hire, callow Midwesterner Jamie Bashant, has moved east with his lovely fiancée Belisa. Jamie and Belisa are a young couple just starting out, and Jamie has to learn the business as a trainee. Ted is very successful, but also cynical, hard-driving, profane, obnoxious, abusive, and a lousy team player. He has few if any friends in the company, but his shortcomings are tolerated because his output is so outstanding. Ted, assigned to train Jamie, watches Jamie struggle, failing with presentation after presentation; Ted tries, in vain, to help Jamie improve his performance and make a few sales, even giving one of his own sure deals to Jamie, who messes it up. Bashant and Riker head to the sales conference and Riker runs into Leguzza. Then, Ted is introduced to Belisa through normal company friendship, and discovers that he is now in love with her. Belisa is impressed by Ted's success and confident manner and also falls in love with him. They then have sex, and do their best to keep this secret from Jamie, who is worried about being fired because of his weak output. Ted and Belisa then go to Ted's place and sleep with each other, before going to Atlantic City, and having sex in a hotel room. Ted confesses to Belisa that he has a failed love in his past, which affected him very deeply, leading to a career switch from college literature professor at Northwestern University near Chicago (a job he loved) to hard-driving star salesman in New York. Belisa does her best to comfort him. Later that night in bed after sex, the two discover a shared interest in Oscar Wilde's novel The Picture of Dorian Gray, which Belisa studied at college and Ted taught every semester.

Ted spends increasingly more time with Belisa and away from the office. Ted is falling hard for Belisa, who postpones her wedding to Jamie; the couple had planned a honeymoon to Jamaica and decides to marry Ted. But Ted's sales performance is dropping dramatically, and since his contribution to the company's profit is so important, the rest of the sales force feels even more pressure. Branch manager John Whitman has prospered with Ted's performance, but starts losing confidence in Ted, and is mystified at Ted's lack of dedication, such a contrast from his previous strong effort. Belisa seems ready to end her engagement to Jamie in favor of Ted, as the two travel to Atlantic City for a getaway from the stress, and use Jamie's week-long absence at a training conference to deepen their relationship. However, the company is in trouble from plummeting sales, not just in New York but at its other locations as well, and downsizing and firings are imminent. Just as Ted's new relationship with Belisa is prospering, his career is sinking. He no longer cares about his career; he avoids the office, doesn't answer his phone or return messages, fails to close several critical deals, and this drives the company closer to ruin. However, his relationship with Belisa, who now promises to leave Jamie and marry Ted, is creating real change in his life, healing his bitterness. Jamie, showing no improvement whatsoever in his job performance is fired just as Belisa breaks their engagement and asks him to move out. He becomes suspicious that Belisa is cheating on him and nears a nervous breakdown. Belisa becomes very concerned and meets with Ted to break off their affair so she can take care of Jamie, informing him they are returning to Ohio together tomorrow. Ted is devastated at Belisa's change of heart, but finally returns to the office the next day to find manager Whitman desperate for him to make some sales as his own career is on the line. Belisa surprises Ted in the parking lot, telling him Jamie went back to Ohio, but she has decided to stay in New York to marry him.

Ted goes to the office to find the company has been taken over by a competing firm that was able to buy the company cheap because poor sales at all the offices lowered the stock price drastically. The office is being closed with dozens of staff personnel being fired, including Manager Whitman. Despite the news, Ted is happy and leaves to go see Belisa at her home. When he gets there she is gone and her house is now empty except for a few boxes stacked in the living room. In the boxes Ted finds evidence that Jamie and Belisa were actually working together to destroy his sales performance. Jamie and Belisa are seen at a party with the president of the competing firm which has just purchased Bineview. It is revealed that the bumbling Jamie is actually a ruthless leader of a team of double agents sent by this competing firm to infiltrate Bineview. The top salesperson at each office has been targeted by one of the double agents, each having their sales performance ruined in different ways, as part of a strategy to weaken the company in preparation for this corporate takeover.

Leguzza explains how he desired to purchase a company but wanted to get it at a cheap price. So he put together a group to cull the company in order to weaken their sales so he would be able to purchase the company. As Jamie explains how he and Belisa were able to distract Ted, destroying his sales performance, his gloating clearly disgusts Belisa who realizes that Ted is her true love. She leaves the party to go to Ted who is seen packing up all his belongings. Jamie confronts his true employer, the corporate shark who masterminded the whole stratagem to gain control of a new, innovative, Bineview business machine, and demands his money using knowledge of the employer's embarrassing sexual proclivity as blackmail. When Belisa arrives at Ted's loft he is already gone, so she goes to her home to find him. As Ted is shown on the road to an unknown destination, she discovers a personal message from Ted in a volume of Wilde's novel The Picture of Dorian Gray which he has left behind for her. With the knowledge that Ted knows the truth, Belisa is left broken-hearted. The movie closes with a smiling and contented Ted arriving at Northwestern University to return to the job he truly loves, teaching.

Cast
Michael Keaton as Ted Riker: A New York salesman and former teacher. He falls in love with and starts dating Belisa.
Brendan Fraser as Jamie Bashant: Belisa's fiancé.
Amber Valletta as Belisa: Jamie's attractive yet neglected fiancé who falls in love with Ted after they have sex one night. She then decides to be with Ted instead of Jamie when he reveals his true colours.
Daniel Stern as John Whitman
Richard Kuhlman as Arthur Crosby
Alexis Cruz as Alvarez
Neal McDonough as Hurly
Michael Lerner as Leguzza
Billy Slaughter as Intern

Production
The Last Time was filmed in August 2005 in New Orleans, Louisiana, and New York City, New York, on a budget of roughly $4,000,000. The film was released in theaters in May 2007.

References

External links
 
 

2006 films
Films shot in New Orleans
Films shot in New York City
Films set in New York City
Films scored by Randy Edelman
2000s English-language films
Films set in Atlantic City, New Jersey